Jerzy Miller (born 7 June 1952 in Kraków) is a Polish politician.  He served as Minister of Interior Affairs in the government of Donald Tusk from 14 October 2009 to 18 November 2011. He succeeded Grzegorz Schetyna in the post.  Miller is officially independent, but was endorsed by the Civic Platform.

References
Biographical notes 

1952 births
Civic Platform politicians
Interior ministers of Poland
Living people
Politicians from Kraków